Thomas Teige (born February 2, 1968, in Aachen, North Rhine-Westphalia) is a German martial artist.

Career 

Thomas Teige was born in Aachen (North Rhine-Westphalia, West Germany) and moved in 1980 to Hamburg, West Germany.

In 1986 at the age of 18 he received black belt in Judo and started training in Taekwondo. He is ranked with the 2nd Dan. Since 1989 he is wearing the black belt.

Titles 

In 2006 Thomas Teige was world champion (ETF) in powerbreaking. He broke 8 wooden boards (each 300 mm x 250 mm x 18 mm, not separated by spacers) with his hand at the ETF Euro-Cup 2006 Taekwondo & Martial Arts Championships in Kaltenkirchen (Germany).

On September 23, 2007, he repeats this world record at the ETF World-Cup 2007 in Hollenstedt (Germany).

References

External links 
 

1968 births
Living people
German male kickboxers
Heavyweight kickboxers
German male taekwondo practitioners
German male judoka
German jujutsuka
Sportspeople from Aachen
Sportspeople from Hamburg
20th-century German people